The Farmers’ Union of Wales (FUW), a member organisation, was formed in 1955 to protect and advance the interests of those who derive an income from Welsh agriculture.

Established in 1955, the FUW is the only agricultural union to be given the official right by the UK Government to represent and speak on behalf of Welsh farmers. The Union has done so at the highest level - at the National Assembly, Whitehall and the European Union.

History 
The FUW was established in 1955 as a result of concerns that the interests of Welsh farmers were secondary to those who farmed in more fertile arable areas in England.

Many sentiments contributed to this sentiment, including the cost of the new NFU headquarters at Knightsbridge (John Morris 18) but a plan to turn a large area in Carmarthenshire into forest by the UK Government caused the NFU Chairman in Carmarthenshire to announce his resignation to members at a meeting on 8 December 1955. Ivor T Davies said that he felt that NFU policies were contrary to the interests of Welsh farmers and spoke about setting up a new farmers' union for Wales. Many of those present walked out but 12 stayed behind and resolved to form the Farmers Union of Wales. They elected Ivor T Davies as chairman and D. T Davies as vice-chairman.

J. B. Evans became the General Secretary of the union, and following a meeting in Aberystwyth, John Morris became the Deputy Secretary General and legal officer of the union. Morris opened an office in Caernarfon to recruit members in Caernarfonshire and Anglesey and by the time he left the union in 1957, there were also offices in Dolgellau, Llangefni and Aberystwyth. The union was active in the campaign against the drowning of Capel Celyn.

By 1959 your Union was a significant organization “The FUW is a force to be reckoned with... Its roots go down into deep soil, invigorated as it may be by past frustrations and controversies, but fed principally from the conviction that the Welsh voice can do more for Welsh agriculture solo than in chorus” (Financial Times)

Ten days before full responsibility for agriculture was transferred to the Welsh Office in 1978, Fred Peart, Minister for Agriculture, Fisheries and Food, announced that the UK Government would recognised the Farmers Union of Wales to speak on behalf of Welsh farmers. This was a pivotal moment for the Union. The Secretary of State of Wales at the time was John Morris, who had worked for the Union during its formative years.

Services 
FUW offers expert advice, discounts and offers to members, advice on the policy and law, a network of local offices, and lobbies government and decision makers to give a voice to Welsh farmers.

Structure 

FUW members elect a Presidential Policy Team at national level who speak on behalf of Welsh farmers at local, national and international level and represent the Union at ministerial meetings, stakeholder workshops and local branch meetings. There are 12 county branches, members of which elect the county committee including a president and a chairman and there is an office for each county branch. The local offices are located at:

 Llangefni (Anglesey)
 Caernarfon (Caernarfonshire)
 Ruthin (Denbighshire and Flintshire)
 Dolgellau (Merionethshire)
 Newtown (Montgomery)
 Builth Wells (Brecon and Radnor)
 Lampeter (Ceredigion)
 Haverfordwest (Pembrokeshire)
 Carmarthen (Carmarthenshire)
 Abergavenny (Gwent)
 Cowbridge (Glamorgan)

There are 11 sector committees, made up of democratically elected farmers' representatives from the Union's 12 county branches for:

 Animal health and welfare
 Common Land
 Education and training
 Diversification
 Upland farming and marginal land
 Land use and parliamentary relations
 Markets, wool and livestock
 Milk and dairy products
 Tenants
 Younger voice

Sector committee members, county officials, union officials and staff meet at the bi-monthly in the General Council, which is the Union's main elected body

The union's headquarters are located in Aberystwyth, Ceredigion.

Officers 

 Glyn Roberts - President
 Ian Rickman, Deputy President
 Eifion Huws, Vice President of North Wales
 Brian Bowen, Vice President of Mid Wales
 Dai Miles, Vice President of South Wales

Former Presidents

 1955-1958 Ivor T Davies
 1958-1961 D T Lewis
 1961-1966 Glyngwyn Roberts
 1966-1984 T. Myrddin Evans
 1984-1991 H. R. M. Hughes
 1991- 2003 Bob Parry
 2003- 2011 Gareth Vaughan
 2011 - 2015 Emyr Jones
 2015- Glyn Roberts

References

External links
 Official website
Description of the FUW Archive at the National Library of Wales

Organizations established in 1955
Agricultural organisations based in Wales
Organisations based in Aberystwyth
Farmers' organizations
1955 establishments in Wales